Yenovk Shahen (3 February 1881 – 28 May 1915) was an ethnic Armenian actor and director who lived in the Ottoman Empire. He was killed during the Armenian genocide.

Life
Yenovk Shahen Yepranosian was born to an Armenian family in the village of Bardizag (Bahcecik) near İzmit on 3 February 1881. He was the brother of Krikor Ankut, an arithmetician who was also deported during the Armenian Genocide but managed to survive. After receiving his early education in Bardizag, he and his family moved to Constantinople.

While in Constantinople, it is noted that Shahen's interest in theatre grew after reading the biography of renowned Armenian playwright Bedros Adamian. He immediately began to play short roles for various plays. Shahen joined a theatrical group led by Mardiros Mnagyan. Thereafter, Shahen switched theatrical groups and joined one that renowned actor Vahram Papazyan already belonged to. Shahen and Papazyan became coworkers and close friends. Continuing his career in acting, Shahen participated in other theatrical groups including those led by Felekian and Zarifyan. Shahen was known for performing throughout the Ottoman Empire including  Cairo, İzmir, İzmit, and his native Bardizag.

Some of his most notable roles as an actor included François Coppée's monologue "La grève des forgerons", Triboulet in Victor Hugo's Le roi s'amuse, Iago in Shakespeare's Othello, and Shylock in The Merchant of Venice.

Death
On 24 April 1915, Shahen was arrested at his home in the Nişantaşı district of Constantinople. Arrests were part of the larger scheme of the Armenian Genocide which included deporting Armenian intellectuals from the capital to the interior provinces of the Ottoman Empire.

Shahen was eventually deported to Ayaş near Ankara where he and other Armenian intellectuals were imprisoned. He was eventually removed from prison and murdered near Ankara at the age of 34.

References

1881 births
1915 deaths
19th-century Armenian male actors
20th-century Armenian male actors
Armenian male stage actors
People who died in the Armenian genocide
Armenians from the Ottoman Empire
Male actors from the Ottoman Empire